All Rise is the debut studio album by English boy band Blue, released on 26 November 2001 in the United Kingdom and on 27 April 2004 in the United States. It peaked at number one on the UK Albums Chart and was certified 4× Platinum in the UK. The album spent 63 weeks on the UK top 75 Albums chart.

Background and release
In May 1999, Lee Ryan and Antony Costa met at the ages of 15 and 17, respectively, when auditioning for a boy band on ITV's This Morning, with Simon Cowell putting the group together. Ryan made it into the band, as did 21-year-old Will Young (who would go on to win the first series of Pop Idol in 2002), although Costa was not chosen. The boy band never took off, but Ryan and Costa remained friends following their meeting. In 2000, Costa and another one of his friends, Duncan James, decided to form their own band, and they were soon joined by Ryan. Their manager Daniel Glatman said, "Duncan came to see me with his friend, Antony Costa, who was also in the same position [wanted to be in the music industry], and they told me that they wanted to do something together. When I asked them if they had anyone in mind to work with, they said they had a friend, Lee Ryan, whom they wanted to invite to join their band. The three of them came in a couple of days later and I was completely blown away by the incredibly talented stars that stood before me." Ryan, Costa, James and Glatman all felt that something was missing and so they went on to audition for a fourth member, a position eventually filled by Ryan's flatmate, Simon Webbe.

Blue started recording for their debut album following their new line-up. They released their debut single "All Rise" in May 2001 and it reached number four on the UK Singles Chart. Their follow-up single "Too Close" was released in August 2001 and peaked at number one. Following this, the band went to New York City to film the "If You Come Back" music video, and while there, they witnessed the attacks on the World Trade Center. The following month, Blue were being interviewed by British newspaper The Sun and Ryan commented that "This New York thing is being blown out of proportion" and asked "What about whales? They are ignoring animals that are more important. Animals need saving and that's more important." The other members of the band tried to silence Ryan, but he went on. This caused a huge media backlash that resulted in Blue losing a record deal in the United States and campaigns to sack Ryan from the group. Despite the backlash, Blue went on to achieve a second UK number-one in November with the ballad.

Singles 
"All Rise" — The debut single, released in May 2001. The single peaked at No. 4 on the UK Singles Chart, No. 3 on the Australian Top 40, at No. 1 in New Zealand and No. 5 in Ireland. The song has received a Silver sales status certification for sales of over 200,000 copies in the UK. "Too Close" was the second single, an it was released in August 2001. The song is a cover version of U.S. R&B group Next's number one hit. The single peaked at No. 1 on the UK Singles Chart, No. 5 on the Australian Top 40, No. 1 in New Zealand and No. 17 in Ireland. The song has received a Silver sales status certification for sales of over 200,000 copies in the UK.

The third single, released was "If You Come Back", it was released in November 2001. The single peaked at No. 1 on the UK Singles Chart. The song was produced by multi-platinum producer Ray Ruffin & co-written by Nicole Formescu, Ray Ruffin, Lee Brennan and Ian Hope. The song has received a Silver sales status certification for sales of over 200,000 copies in the UK. "Fly By II" was chosen as the fourth and final single, it was released in March 2002. The single peaked at No. 6 on the UK Singles Chart, at No. 9 in New Zealand, No. 16 in Ireland, and No. 23 in Belgium. The song has received a Silver sales status certification for sales of over 200,000 copies in the UK. 

The song "Best in Me" was released as a single exclusively in New Zealand in August 2002, peaking at No. 10 on the New Zealand Singles Chart. A music video was recorded and was later used to promote the group's compilation album, Best of Blue.

Critical reception 

The album received mixed to positive reviews from critics. Sharon Mawer of AllMusic gave the album three and half stars out of five and noted, "The vocals were sung as if there was some real feeling, and that maybe is what separated Blue from their peers." Andre Paine of the NME gave the album five stars out of ten stating, when describing some of the tracks that "All of these are fine, but so as not to alienate a single teenage girl, there's also the traditional boyband slop; 'If You Come Back' ...the ballads and various Backstreet Boys rip-offs. But at least Stargate & Ray Ruffin know what they do. And Blue are young and talented enough to secure themselves a successful pop career."

Commercial performance
The album All Rise was released in time for Christmas and reached number one, eventually selling in excess of 1.3 million copies in the UK. The final single from the album, "Fly by II", reached number six in March 2002. It peaked at number one on the UK Albums Chart and was certified 4× Platinum in the UK. The album spent 63 weeks on the UK top 75 Albums chart.

Track listing 

Notes
 signifies an additional producer
 signifies an additional vocal producer
 signifies a remix producer

Charts

Weekly charts

Year-end charts

Decade-end charts

Certifications and sales

References 

2001 debut albums
Albums produced by Stargate
Blue (English band) albums